Matthew Tyler Giobbi (born 1974) is an author and educator in the fields of music, science criticism, philosophy, media theory, psychoanalysis, and psychology.  He has written A Postcognitive Negation: The Sadomasochistic Dialectic of American Psychology.

References

External links

1974 births
Living people
21st-century American psychologists
Musicians from Easton, Pennsylvania
Writers from Easton, Pennsylvania